Kim Dong-woo (born 1 June 1995) is a South Korean alpine skier. Kim competed at the 2018 Winter Olympics for South Korea.

References

External links

South Korean male alpine skiers
Alpine skiers at the 2018 Winter Olympics
Olympic alpine skiers of South Korea
Korea National Sport University alumni
1995 births
Living people
Alpine skiers at the 2012 Winter Youth Olympics
Competitors at the 2015 Winter Universiade
Competitors at the 2017 Winter Universiade
Competitors at the 2019 Winter Universiade
21st-century South Korean people